Muskiki Springs was a community in Saskatchewan, Canada.

References 

Bayne No. 371, Saskatchewan
Unincorporated communities in Saskatchewan
Division No. 15, Saskatchewan